Henry Ramos (born April 15, 1992) is a Puerto Rican professional baseball outfielder in the Cincinnati Reds organization. He previously played in Major League Baseball (MLB) for the Arizona Diamondbacks and in the KBO League for the KT Wiz.

Career
Ramos attended Alfonso Casta Martinez High School in Maunabo, Puerto Rico. He was drafted the Boston Red Sox in the 5th round of the 2010 MLB draft.

Boston Red Sox
Ramos split the 2010 season between the Gulf Coast League Red Sox and the Lowell Spinners, hitting a combined .281/.341/.400/.741 with 3 home runs and 28 RBI. He spent the 2011 and 2021 season with the Greenville Drive; hitting .262/.299/.383/.682 with 5 home runs and 43 RBI in 2011, and .254/.327/.381/.708 with 8 home runs and 63 RBI in 2012. Ramos spent the 2013 season with the Salem Red Sox, hitting .252/.330/.416/.745 with 12 home runs and 55 RBI. His 2014 season was spent with the Portland Sea Dogs, hitting .326/.368/.431/.799 with 2 home runs and 23 RBI, but playing in only 43 games due to a stress fracture in his left leg. Ramos split the 2015 season between the GCL, Lowell, and Portland, hitting a combined .257/.335/.347/.682 with 11 RBI. He split the 2016 season between Ports land and the Pawtucket Red Sox, hitting a combined .263/.306/.402/.708 with 8 home runs and 40 RBI. He became a free agent following the 2016 season.

Los Angeles Dodgers
Ramos signed a minor league contract with the Los Angeles Dodgers in November 2016. He split the 2017 season between the Tulsa Drillers and the Oklahoma City Dodgers, hitting a combined .351/.396/.546/.943 with 8 home runs and 25 RBI. He spent the 2018 season with OKC, hitting .297/.352/.465/.817 with 10 home runs and 58 RBI. He became a free agent following the 2018 season.

San Francisco Giants
He signed a minor league contract with the San Francisco Giants, and spent the 2019 season with the Sacramento River Cats, hitting .269/.319/.439/.757 with 12 home runs and 40 RBI. He was released in August 2019.

Texas Rangers
Ramos signed a minor league contract with the Texas Rangers in January 2020. He did not play in 2020, due to the cancelation of the minor league season because of the COVID-19 pandemic.

Arizona Diamondbacks
He signed a minor league contract with the Arizona Diamondbacks in May 2021. He was assigned to the Reno Aces, hitting .371/.439/.582/1.021 with 12 home runs and 57 RBI. On September 5, 2021, Arizona selected his contract and promoted him to the active roster. He made his MLB debut that day as a pinch hitter in the seventh inning of a game against the Seattle Mariners. Ramos collected his first career hit in that at-bat with a single off of Mariners reliever Erik Swanson. Ramos was outrighted off of the 40-man roster on October 7, 2021.

KT Wiz
On December 1, 2021, Ramos signed with the KT Wiz of the KBO League. In 2022, Ramos appeared in 18 games, hitting .250/.304/.417 with 3 home runs, 11 RBI, and 2 stolen bases before suffering a toe fracture on April 23. He was released by the team on May 26, when KT signed Anthony Alford.

Cincinnati Reds
On January 9, 2023, Ramos signed a minor league deal with the Cincinnati Reds.

Personal life
His older brother, Héctor Ramos, is a professional soccer player and the all-time top scorer of the Puerto Rican national team. His younger brother, Heliot Ramos, is also a professional baseball player.

References

External links

1992 births
Living people
People from Maunabo, Puerto Rico
Major League Baseball players from Puerto Rico
Major League Baseball outfielders
Arizona Diamondbacks players
Gulf Coast Red Sox players
Lowell Spinners players
Leones de Ponce players
Greenville Drive players
Salem Red Sox players
Portland Sea Dogs players
Criollos de Caguas players
Pawtucket Red Sox players
Indios de Mayagüez players
Tulsa Drillers players
Oklahoma City Dodgers players
Tomateros de Culiacán players
Sacramento River Cats players
Reno Aces players
Puerto Rican expatriate baseball players in Mexico
KT Wiz players
Puerto Rican expatriate baseball players in South Korea
2023 World Baseball Classic players